Barevo is a village in the municipalities of Jajce, Bosnia and Herzegovina.

Demographics 
According to the 2013 census, its population was 685.

References

Populated places in Jezero, Bosnia and Herzegovina
Populated places in Jajce
Villages in Republika Srpska